Vila Nova is a subdivision of the city of Praia in the island of Santiago, Cape Verde. Its population was 4,868 at the 2010 census. It is situated north of the city centre. Adjacent neighbourhoods  are Safende to the north, Ponta de Água to the east, Lem Cachorro to the southeast, Achadinha to the south and Calabaceira to the west. Ribeira da Trindade forms its southern border.

References

Subdivisions of Praia